Live on Other Planets is a double live album by Supergrass. Released on 27 November 2020, it consists of songs recorded during the band's reunion tour from earlier that year. Its title is a play on the band's fourth studio album, Life on Other Planets.

Background
In 2018, the former members of Supergrass set in motion plans for a reunion tour in 2020 with the purpose of celebrating the 25th and 10th anniversaries of their formation and break-up, respectively. Following a surprise set at Glastonbury Festival’s Pilton Party on 6 September 2019, the band announced their 2020 reunion tour dates in Europe and the U.S.

The Supergrass reunion gigs were well-received, with their 21 February show at the Barrowland Ballroom in Glasgow garnering a five-star review from The Guardian. However, after completing their February and early March tour dates in Europe and U.K., by mid-March the band had to cancel the rest of their gigs because of the COVID-19 pandemic, including shows in the U.S. and Australia, and appearances at various festival, including Glastonbury.

Release
On 25 September 2020, Supergrass announced the 27 November release of Live on Other Planets. The album was released to mark the band's 25th anniversary; to capture the reunion gigs and thank the fans who attended; and to support grassroots music venues, with proceeds from the album's sales going to the #SaveOurVenues campaign in aid of venues struggling due to the pandemic.

The CD edition of the album includes the bonus disc Bully for You, a full-set recording of the band's live-streamed performance on 21 August 2020 at The Bullingdon, Oxford.

Track listing
Adapted from CD liner notes.

Personnel
Supergrass
 Gaz Coombes – lead vocals, electric guitar, acoustic guitar
 Mick Quinn – bass, backing vocals
 Danny Goffey – drums, backing vocals
 Rob Coombes – keyboards

Production
 Mick Quinn – album co-ordination, artistic direction, cover design
 Max Bisgrove – recording engineer
 John Cornfield – mixing
 Tim Turan – mastering
 Adriaan Pels – photography
 Sabrina Benrehab – photography
 Gaz Coombes – photography
 Bruce Brand and Mary Teneketzis at Arthole – cover design

References

Supergrass albums
2020 live albums
Alternative rock albums by British artists